I Phone You is a 2011 Chinese/German romantic comedy film directed by Tang Dan.

Cast
 Florian Lukas
 Jiang Yiyan as Ling Ling

References

External links
 

Films shot in Chongqing
Films set in Berlin
2011 romantic comedy films
2011 films
Chinese romantic comedy films
German romantic comedy films
English-language Chinese films
English-language German films
2010s German films